Wales Minor Counties Cricket Club was formed in 1988, and first competed in the Minor Counties Championship in their founding season.  They have appeared in eighteen List A matches, making nine NatWest Trophy and nine Cheltenham & Gloucester Trophy appearances.  The players in this list have all played at least one List A match.  Wales Minor Counties cricketers who have not represented the county in List A cricket are excluded from the list.

Players are listed in order of appearance, where players made their debut in the same match, they are ordered by batting order.  Players in bold have played first-class cricket.

Key

List of players

List A captains

See also
 Wales Minor Counties Cricket Club

References

External links 
 List A matches played by Wales Minor Counties at CricketArchive

Wales Minor Counties Cricket Club

Wales Minor Counties
Cricketers